The New South Wales College of Clinical Pastoral Education is a consortium of Clinical Pastoral Education providers based in New South Wales.  The College accredits supervisors, centres and courses in NSW and provides certificates for the successful completion of courses. It is available for people interested in pastoral ministry who have the capacity to learn and grow by reflecting on their own experiences in ministry.
The college is a member institution of the Sydney College of Divinity, providing post-graduate degrees in Clinical Pastoral Education.

Member institutions
 Centre for Pastoral Education at Westmead Hospital (NSW), operating from Westmead Hospital
St Vincent's Hospital CPE Centre (NSW), operating from St. Vincent's Hospital
Sydney Adventist Hospital (NSW), operating from Sydney Adventist Hospital
 Hunter Centre for Clinical Pastoral Education (NSW), operating from John Hunter Hospital 
 The Mental Health Clinical Pastoral Education Centre (NSW)
 Southern tablelands Clinical Pastoral Education Centre (NSW)
 Gosford CPE Centre (NSW), operating from Gosford Hospital

References

Clinical pastoral education
Seminaries and theological colleges in New South Wales